Hadothrips is a genus of thrips in the Phlaeothripidae.

Species
 Hadothrips robiniae

References

Phlaeothripidae
Thrips
Thrips genera